Kuranakh may refer to:
Kuranakh-Sala, a settlement in the Sakha Republic, Russia
Verkhny Kuranakh, a settlement in the Sakha Republic, Russia
Nizhny Kuranakh, a settlement in the Sakha Republic, Russia
Kuranakh-Yuryakh, a river in the Sakha Republic, Russia
Kuranakh-Siktyakh, a river in the Sakha Republic, Russia
Kuranakh mine